The McKinsey Quarterly is a business magazine focused on management and organizational theory. It is written primarily by McKinsey consultants and alumni, with some guest authors. It also publishes research from the McKinsey Global Institute, which was founded in 1990 and conducts original research on economic issues. The magazine is published quarterly and has one special issue each year. McKinsey clients are given early access to upcoming issues. McKinsey & Company provides two awards each year for articles that had the greatest impact on management based on the assessment of a panel of judges from the business community. The magazine was founded in 1964. It was initially an internal document at McKinsey & Company shared with consultants and clients, until it was published more broadly in the 1990s. It is also indexed in Business Periodicals Index.

References

External links
 

1964 establishments in Washington (state)
Business magazines published in the United States
English-language magazines
McKinsey & Company
Magazines established in 1964
Magazines published in Seattle
Quarterly magazines published in the United States